Šare Viaduct is located between the Ravča and Vrgorac interchanges of the A1 motorway in Croatia, opened for traffic on June 30, 2011. Each of the structures is supported by a pair of abutments and 11 H-section piers. The deck structures are executed using incremental launching and comprise a box girder of constant cross-sections each.

Completion of Šare Viaduct and Vrgorac interchange were delayed due to funding problems, pushing back its completion from the originally scheduled 2009 to mid-2011. Since June 30, 2011, the viaduct is open for traffic and tolled as a part of the A1 motorway.

See also
List of bridges by length

References

Box girder bridges
Toll bridges in Croatia
Viaducts in Croatia
Buildings and structures in Split-Dalmatia County
Transport in Split-Dalmatia County